Ciocia ( in Rome and Northern Lazio; plural ciocie) is a modern Roman dialect's term to indicate a footwear of some mountainous areas of Southern and South-Eastern Europe, in particular Central and Southern Italy as well as the Balkans (opanci).

Origins and history
The name probably comes from late Latin soccus, meaning slipper. It has many other forms in some Italian dialects like chioca, chiochiera, ciòcero or sciòscio in Neapolitan language. The term ciociari, a pejorative modern Roman term used to indicate poor mountain shepherds, have a lexical similarity to the noun ciocia, so many historians thought they have their root word in local footwear's name, so ciociari would mean 'people who wear ciocie'.

Central and Southern Italian poor peasants and shepherds used to wear ciocie and they were represented in the 19th century in paintings and poetry for their typical shoes and for their coloured clothes. Kosovo and North Macedonia similar footwears are reported as well.

In the traditional form, ciocie were made of large soles in leather and straps (strenghe or curiole) with which the leg was tied from the ankle to the knee. Before donning the ciocie, the feet, ankles, and calves were covered by a large napkin (pezza, plural pezze), instead of socks.

See also

Ciociaria
Central Italian
Southern Italian

Notes

References

External links
 La ciocia.it
 La terra delle ciocie

Abruzzo
Ciociaria
Italian folklore
Italian clothing
Footwear
Molise
Folk footwear
Shoes
Sandals